Brenda Chester DoHarris (born 9 June 1946) is a writer and academic from Guyana.

Career
Doharris was born in Georgetown, British Guiana and attended Bishops' High School on scholarship. Her education and experience growing up in rural Kitty were a major influence on her writing.

She is a professor of English at Bowie State University in Bowie, Maryland, and a graduate of Columbia University and Howard University, where she received a B.A. (1970) then M.S. (1972) in English. The first Guyanese woman to run in Guyana for office of presidency of a trades union, she became actively involved in the Guyanese political movement for democracy during the 1970s.

She has travelled widely in Africa, the Caribbean and China, where she attended the U.S./China Joint Conference on Women's Issues. Her area of scholarly interest is post-colonial women's literature.

Works
Her novel The Coloured Girl in the Ring: A Guyanese Woman Remembers (1997) is a fictional exploration of a young Black woman's coming of age in British Guiana of the late 1950s and early 1960s. Told against the backdrop of political and racial turbulence, the novel employs a first-person narrative format and proffers a well-defined portrait of the main character's recollection of her family life, her oppressive school teachers, her friends' doomed inter-racial romance and her thoughts on race and identity.

According to a review in the College Language Association Journal, "The story is remarkable for its picture of a Guyanese village, but it requires a sequel to truly explore the life of this nameless narrator, who remains more an onlooker and reporter than the central persona of this piece." A review from Kaieteur News  describes it as "...a bitter-sweet narrative, one that is poignant and deeply moving, and made even more so by a feminist perspective that rightly celebrates the sustaining role of women in colonised societies."

Calabash Parkway (2005) is about Guyanese immigrant women in Brooklyn, New York, women who struggle against the odds to gain legal residence.

Doharris was a contributor for Walter A. Rodney: A Promise of Revolution by Clairmont Chung. 2012.

Awards
Calabash Parkway won the Guyana Prize for Literature.

References

Living people
Howard University alumni
Bowie State University faculty
Guyanese emigrants to the United States
Guyanese novelists
20th-century novelists
21st-century novelists
20th-century women writers
21st-century women writers
1946 births